Sanguirana tipanan is a species of true frog. It is native to the Sierra Madre mountains of the island of Luzon, Philippines. It inhabits cool streams and rivers in lower montane and lowland forests. It is threatened by logging and habitat loss.

References

tipanan
Amphibians of the Philippines
Endemic fauna of the Philippines
Fauna of Luzon
Amphibians described in 2000